John Wiggins was an American politician.

At birth, Wiggins was a slave. He was elected to the Louisiana House of Representatives from De Soto Parish on December 4, 1872, and served as a Republican until his death on January 2, 1874.

References

1874 deaths
Louisiana Republicans
19th-century American politicians
African-American politicians during the Reconstruction Era
Year of birth missing
People from DeSoto Parish, Louisiana
American freedmen
African-American state legislators in Louisiana